The Conférence des Grandes Écoles (CGE), French for "Conference of Grandes Écoles", is a French national institution, created in 1973. It mainly acts as an association of Grandes Écoles, providing representation, research and accreditation. A Grande école is a French institution of higher education that is separate from, but parallel and often connected to, the main framework of the French public university system. Grandes écoles are elite academic institutions that admit students through an extremely competitive process, and a significant proportion of their graduates occupy the highest levels of French society. Similar to Ivy League schools in the United States, Russel Group in the UK, and C9 League in China, graduation from a grande école is considered the prerequisite credential for any top government, administrative and corporate position in France. 

Not all Grandes écoles are members of the CGE.  To be a member, Grandes écoles must be accredited for postgraduate education and apply a strict criteria for: student recruitment and enrollment; instruction and programs; international research and reputation; connections with private industry; and student support.

Accreditation 

The CGE provides nearly 600 accredited training courses and a range of training and research in line with the French labor market. Each of the Conférence des grandes écoles and CGE labels attests to the quality of a complete training process at each school and ensures compliance with these fundamental principles: excellence, professional integration, international openness, training accreditation. As an accreditation body, the CGE created an Accreditation Commission made up of 32 experts, headed by Stéphanie Lavigne, General Manager at TBS Education, to grant the training courses offered by its member schools one of the quality labels of the CGE. The CGE maintains the level of quality and excellence that defines its member schools by investigating requests for first accreditation and when a CGE school's accreditation period expires or when their content and training methods change, and through random checks and on-site audits. 

CGE accredited programs:
Programme Grande École (PGE) - A flagship, five-year professional training program that ends with a Bac+5 level diploma, such as a Masters in Management, Masters in Engineering, Masters in Veterinary Medicine, etc.
Master of Science (MSc)  - Mastery of an international, specialized field (such as finance, data science, fluids engineering, etc.) with at least half of all courses taught in English.  Program ends with a Bac+5 or a Bac+6 level diploma, such as MSc in: Artificial Intelligence & Business Analytics;  European Animal Management; Luxury & Fashion Management.
Specialized Master (MS)  - An advanced level mastery in a specific field. Program ends with a Bac+6 level diploma, such as MS in: Administration and Public Policy; Biomedical Technology; or Œnology/Wines.
BADGE  -  A training certification for Bac+2 graduates or those with 5 years of professional experience.
CQC (Certificate of Qualification and Skills) - Short courses and certification directed at a particular set of professional needs.

Prestige 

Grandes Écoles are highly selective public or private institutions accredited by the CGE with degrees are awarded by the Ministry of National Education (France) and recognized worldwide. Most Grandes Écoles are dedicated to business and engineering, but there are also the Écoles Normales Supérieures (ENS), the institutes of political studies (IEP), veterinary schools, and other schools in a variety of specialized areas. Although they are more expensive than public universities in France, Grandes Écoles typically have smaller class sizes and student bodies and many of their programs are taught in English. International internships, study abroad opportunities, and close ties with government and the corporate world are a hallmark of the Grandes Écoles.

Out of the 250 business schools in France, only 39 are Conférence des Grandes Écoles members, and many CGE Grandes Écoles are among the top ranked business schools in Europe.

Times Higher Education ranked these Grandes Écoles in the top 20 worldwide (small universities: fewer than 5,000 students):

Several CGE members have roots in the 18th and early 19th centuries, and a few are even older than the term Grande école, which dates to 1794. Grandes écoles in the 18th century focused mostly on training civil servants and military engineers, and the curriculum was primarily mathematics and physical sciences. During the early 19th century, a number of Grandes écoles were established to support industry and commerce. Some CGE members are among the oldest continually operating educational institutions in France.

Founding members 

École Centrale des Arts et Manufactures (École Centrale Paris - ECP)
École des Hautes Études Commerciales (HEC Paris)
École Nationale des Ponts et Chaussées (Ponts - ENPC)
École Nationale Supérieure de l’Aéronautique et de l’Espace (ISAE-SUPAERO)
École Nationale Supérieure des Arts et Métiers (Paris) ( Arts et Métiers ParisTech - ENSAM)
École Nationale Supérieure des Mines de Paris (Mines ParisTech - ENSM.P.)
École Nationale Supérieure des Mines de Saint-Étienne (MINES Saint-Étienne)
École Nationale Supérieure des Mines de Nancy (Mines Nancy)
École Nationale Supérieure des Mines de Rabat (Mines Rabat)
École Nationale Supérieure des Techniques Avancées (ENSTA Paris)
École Nationale Supérieure des Télécommunications (Télécom Paris - ENST)
École Polytechnique (École Polytechnique - EP or l'X)
École Supérieure d’Electricité (Supélec - ESE)
École Supérieure de Physique et Chimie Industrielle de la Ville de Paris (ESPCI Paris)
Institut National Agronomique Paris-Grignon (Institut national agronomique Paris Grignon INA-PG)

See also
Commission Nationale de la Certification Professionnelle
Commission des Titres d'Ingénieur
Conférence des Directeurs des Écoles Françaises d'Ingénieurs
Grandes écoles
Council of NITSER
Education in France

References

External links
 CGE Official website

Grandes écoles
1973 establishments in France
School accreditors
Organizations established in 1973